DYNAS (from Dynamic Selectivity) is a dynamic analog filtering and tuning technology to improve the reception of FM radio broadcasts under adverse conditions.

Overview
The trademarked DYNAS system is based on the same principles as the In Channel Select (ICS) system by H.u.C. Elektronik. The novel tracking filter arrangement was originally conceived by the German engineer Jens Hansen in 1982. The concept was prototyped as High Select in summer 1983. With funding from innovation funds of the city of Berlin, Hansen left Bosch/Blaupunkt to start, with companion Klaus Müller-Catito, his own company H.u.C. Elektronik in 1984. When licensing negotiations with his former employer failed, the system was marketed in the early 1990s as DYNAS by the German Telefunken electronic (a spin-off of AEG-Telefunken and DASA, firming as  since 1992), who, with the related  (the former AEG-Telefunken Halbleiterwerk in Heilbronn), also designed integrated circuits implementing the system, the TEMIC/TFK U4290B (stand-alone FM IF DYNAS system in 68-pin PLCC package), U4291B (DYNAS coprocessor) and U4292B (software-controlled DYNAS system in 44-pin SSO package).

Compared to conventional receivers, DYNAS has a more than 26 dB better selectivity and a typically twice as good sensitivity (improved by 6 dB) thereby almost doubling the reception area and allowing to receive even extremely noisy stations. This is achieved by an adaptive bandwidth of the IF filter and by dynamically tracking of the center frequency of the IF filter in real-time.

With a transmitter spacing of 200 kHz an undisturbed reception in stereo is possible, with 100 kHz a largely undisturbed mono reception is still possible.

The principle has been adopted in some high-end FM tuners like the analog Burmester Tuner 915 (1991) or the digital synthesizer tuners Onkyo Integra T-4970 (1992) and T-488F (1993) as well as in various car radios, such as the Alpine 7619R (1989) and 1310R/3681 (1990), the JVC KS-CG10 (1992), the Clarion CRX121R (1993), CRX123R (1993), CRX121RM and CRX123RM, the Gelhard GXR 990S (1993) or the Conrad Soundcraft AR6800 DYNAS, which are particularly affected by difficult and rapidly changing reception conditions.

Similar technologies 
The In Channel Select (ICS) system by H.u.C. Elektronik in 1984 is a DYNAS predecessor mainly for narrowband FM receivers. It is based on the High Select tracking filter (German:  aka ) developed by Jens Hansen since 1982. ICS improved the selectivity by about 20 dB and the sensitivity by about 6 dB.

A very similar technology is the Active Real-time Tracing System (ARTS), as was implemented in the Pioneer Elite F-91 and some versions of the F-717 high-end tuners in 1987.

Super Sound Tracing (SST) is a similar technology by Sony affecting the RF rather than the IF stage. A four-stage SST system was implemented in high-end tuners such as the ST-S555ESX (1986), ST-S333ESX (1986), ST-S444ESX/ST-S700ES (1987), ST-S800ES (1987) and ST-S333ESX II (1987)/ST-S730ES (1988). Advanced SST, dividing the tuning range into 32 sections, was implemented in some model variants of the ST-S739ES, ST-S333ESG (1989)/ST-S770ES (1990) ST-S333ESA (1991), ST-S333ESJ (1993), ST-S707ES (1993) and ST-SA5ES (1994/1996).

Blaupunkt's Sharx technology, as introduced in 1997 in the Modena & Lausanne RD 148 car radios with "DigiCeiver", is a similar digital solution implemented in software. The original Sharx implementation still relied on a bank of switchable analog ceramic resonators for the IF filter stage before the A/D conversion for further processing of the signal in the DSP section. Around 2000, the switchable IF filter moved into the digital domain as well, that is, it was integrated into the DigiCeiver/TwinCeiver chip leaving only the first stage of the IF filter a discrete part.

See also 
  Syntektor
 FM DX
 Frequency-following receiver
 Threshold extension demodulation
 Frequency demodulator using feedback or FM, FM feedback (FMFB)

Notes

References

Further reading 
 
 
 
 
 
 
 
 
 
 
 
  (6 pages)
  (viii+750+9+v pages)
 
  (9 pages) 
  (34 pages) ;  (15 pages) (NB. Presented before the New York Section of the I.R.E. on 1939-05-03.)
  (7 pages) 
 
 
 
 
 FR8121986A
 
 
 
 
  
  
  
 
 
  
 
 http://antique-autoradio-madness.org/alpine/Alpine-1989/alpine-1989-cata_4.htm
 https://www.fmtunerinfo.com/ST-SA5service.pdf (Describes the old PCB layout in a model variant without SST populated.)
 https://patentimages.storage.googleapis.com/8d/fc/40/37ed83234d8c81/US4293818.pdf
 
 
 
 https://www.rundfunkforum.de/viewtopic.php?t=15593

 
 

Radio technology
Radio electronics